Additional sex combs like 2, transcriptional regulator is a protein that in humans is encoded by the ASXL2 gene.

Function

This gene encodes a member of a family of epigenetic regulators that bind various histone-modifying enzymes and are involved in the assembly of transcription factors at specific genomic loci. Naturally occurring mutations in this gene are associated with cancer in several tissue types (breast, bladder, pancreas, ovary, prostate, and blood). This gene plays an important role in neurodevelopment, cardiac function, adipogenesis, and osteoclastogenesis.

References

Further reading